Royal Racing Club de Bruxelles is a Belgian sports club based in Uccle, Brussels. The club is most well known for its field hockey section with both the first men's and women's teams playing in the Belgian Hockey League.

The first men's team won their sixth league title during the 2021–22 season which was also their first title in 81 years.

Honours

Men
Belgian Hockey League
 Winners (6): 1923–24, 1932–33, 1934–35, 1935–36, 1940–41, 2021–22
EuroHockey Indoor Club Cup
 Runners-up (2): 2013, 2018
EuroHockey Indoor Club Trophy
 Winners (1): 2017
 Runners-up (1): 2012
EuroHockey Indoor Club Challenge I
 Winners (2): 2009, 2011

Women
Belgian Hockey League
 Winners (6): 1923–24, 1924–25, 1926–27, 1932–33, 1947–48, 1948–49

Current squad

Men's squad

Women's squad
Head coach Xavi Arnau 
Assistant coach Olivier Coulon 
Video Analyst Nicolas Roche 
Physical Trainer Bertrand Dujardin 
Manager Sybille Watteeus

References

External links

 
Belgian field hockey clubs
Field hockey clubs established in 1891
Uccle
Sport in Brussels
1891 establishments in Belgium